The former Deerfield Valley Agricultural Society Fairgrounds or Charlemont Fairgrounds, now known as Memorial Park, is a public park in Charlemont, Massachusetts.  The  property occupies a plateau above the town, and is reached via an access road (Park Road) from Massachusetts Route 8A near the Bissell Bridge.  Now a passive recreation facility managed by the town, it is one of the least-altered 19th-century fairgrounds in the state, with a grandstand, exhibition building, and racetrack built in the late 19th century.  The property was listed on the National Register of Historic Places in 2011.

Description and history
Charlemont's Memorial Park is located a short way north of the village center, on an elevated plateau above Massachusetts Route 8A. On the western side of the oval is the park's largest building, a wooden grandstand. The grandstand has fourteen rows of bleacher-style seating, set above an enclosed ground level that functioned originally as an exhibition space and dining hall. A period two-story exhibition building is located southwest of the track. Inside the oval stands a modern picnic pavilion.

The fairground was opened in 1871, and the fairs staged there were a vehicle by which agricultural practices and techniques could be shared within the regional farming community. The open areas of the grounds would have been packed with temporary structures housing all types of exhibitions, displays, and amusements. The exhibition hall was built about 1885, and the grandstand in 1892. The last fair was held on the grounds in 1934. It was occasionally used for a variety of large-scale public events thereafter, and the track was at one point used as a venue for demolition derbies. The town took ownership of the property in 1940, and has most recently adapted for use as a passive recreational facility.

See also
National Register of Historic Places listings in Franklin County, Massachusetts

References

National Register of Historic Places in Franklin County, Massachusetts
Historic districts in Franklin County, Massachusetts
Charlemont, Massachusetts
Parks in Massachusetts
Fairgrounds in the United States
Parks on the National Register of Historic Places in Massachusetts